Pleurotomella annulata is a species of sea snail, a marine gastropod mollusk in the family Raphitomidae.

Description
The length of the shell attains 5.2 mm.

Distribution
This marine species occurs in the Davis Sea and the Weddell Sea, Antarctica.

References

 Dell, R.K. 1990. Antarctic Mollusca: with special reference to the fauna of the Ross Sea. Bulletin of the Royal Society of New Zealand 27: 1–311
 Engl, W. 2012. Shells of Antarctica. Hackenheim : Conchbooks 402 pp.

External links
 Die antarktischen Schnecken und Muscheln, In: Deutsche Südpolar-Expedition 1901-1903 (Erich von Drygalski, E.v. ed.), vol. 8, No. 5, Georg Reimer, Berlin.
 Kantor Y.I., Harasewych M.G. & Puillandre N. (2016). A critical review of Antarctic Conoidea (Neogastropoda). Molluscan Research. 36(3): 153-206
 
  Griffiths, H.J.; Linse, K.; Crame, J.A. (2003). SOMBASE - Southern Ocean mollusc database: a tool for biogeographic analysis in diversity and evolution. Organisms Diversity and Evolution. 3: 207-213

annulata
Gastropods described in 1912